Jade Cargo International operated the following services until bankruptcy.

Scheduled destinations

Asia

East Asia
  
 Hong Kong International Airport 
 
 Chengdu - Chengdu Shuangliu International Airport 
 Shanghai - Shanghai Pudong International Airport hub 
 Shenzhen - Shenzhen Bao'an International Airport main hub
 Tianjin - Tianjin Binhai International Airport 
 Yantai - Yantai Penglai International Airport
 
 Seoul - Incheon International Airport

South Asia
 
 Chennai - Chennai International Airport 
 Kolkata - Netaji Subhas Chandra Bose International Airport
 Mumbai - Chhatrapati Shivaji International Airport

Southeast Asia
 
 Hanoi - Noi Bai International Airport

The Middle East
 
 Dubai - Dubai International Airport

Europe

Central Europe
 
 Vienna - Vienna International Airport 
 
 Geneva - Geneva Airport

Southern Europe
 
 Brescia - Brescia Airport
 Milan - Milan Malpensa Airport
 
 Barcelona - Barcelona–El Prat Airport
 
 Istanbul - Istanbul Airport

Western Europe
 
 Frankfurt - Frankfurt Airport hub
 
 Luxembourg City - Luxembourg Airport
 
 Amsterdam - Amsterdam Airport Schiphol hub

Seasonal and charter destinations

Africa

South Africa
 
 Johannesburg - O. R. Tambo International Airport

West Africa
  
 Lagos - Murtala Muhammed International Airport

America

Caribbean
  
 Curaçao - Curaçao International Airport

South America
 
 Curitiba - Afonso Pena International Airport
 São Paulo - Viracopos-Campinas International Airport
  
 Bogotá - El Dorado International Airport
  
 Quito - Mariscal Sucre International Airport

Asia

Central Asia
  
 Karaganda - Sary-Arka Airport

East Asia
  
 Osaka - Kansai International Airport
  
 Beijing - Beijing Capital International Airport
 Chongqing - Chongqing Jiangbei International Airport

South Asia
  
 Delhi - Indira Gandhi International Airport
 Bangalore - Kempegowda International Airport

Southeast Asia
  
 Singapore Changi Airport
  
 Bangkok - Suvarnabhumi Airport

The Middle East
  
 Muscat - Muscat International Airport
  
 Karachi - Jinnah International Airport
 Lahore - Allama Iqbal International Airport
  
 Sharjah - Sharjah International Airport

Europe

Eastern Europe
  
 Tallinn - Tallinn Airport
  
 Tbilisi - Tbilisi International Airport
  
 Kaunas - Kaunas International Airport

Northern Europe
  
 Helsinki - Helsinki Airport
  
 Stockholm - Stockholm Arlanda Airport
 Malmö - Malmö Airport

Southern Europe
  
 Larnaca - Larnaca International Airport

Western Europe
  
 Cologne/Bonn - Cologne Bonn Airport
 Hannover - Hanover Airport 
 Leipzig/Halle - Leipzig/Halle Airport
 Munich - Munich Airport

References

Lists of airline destinations